Ekulti Ek is a 2013 Marathi film directed and produced by Sachin. The film stars himself alongside his daughter, Shriya Pilgaonkar in the lead.

Cast 
 Sachin Pilgaonkar as Arun Deshpande
 Shriya Pilgaonkar as Swara
Supriya Pilgaonkar as Nandini Deshpande
 Siddharth Menon
 Ashok Saraf as Mehta
Kishori Shahane  as Madhura
Nirmiti Sawant
 Maadhav Deochake

Production 
Sachin liked his daughter's performance in the short film Freedom to Love and gave her the script of Ekulti Ek.

Release 
The Times of India gave the film three out of five stars and wrote that "The overall performances of actors, the script speaking of children growing in broken homes, and some very touching moments make this watchable".

Awards

References

External links

2013 films
2010s Marathi-language films